Çankaya is an underground station on the Fahrettin Altay—Evka 3 Line of the İzmir Metro in Konak. Located beneath Fevzi Paşa Boulevard, it is one of the ten original stations of the metro system. The architecture of the station consists of a main hall with a high ceiling, with mezzanines on both sides. The only other station to share this architecture is Konak. Connection to ESHOT city bus service is available above ground. Çankaya station is located near the northern entrance to the historic Kemeraltı marketplace.

Çankaya station was opened on 22 May 2000.

Connections
ESHOT operates city bus service on Fevzipaşa boulevard.

Nearby Places of Interest
Kemeraltı
Hisar Mosque

References

İzmir Metro
Railway stations opened in 2000
2000 establishments in Turkey
Railway stations in İzmir Province